JioCinema is an Indian advertising video on-demand and over-the-top streaming service, owned by Viacom 18, a subsidiary of TV18. Launched on 5 September 2016, JioCinema's content library includes films, television shows, web series, music videos, documentaries and sports. After the successful merger with Viacom 18 in September 2022, Viacom18 shifted all its sporting content from Voot to JioCinema making it the digital sporting destination of the network. The mobile app is available for Android and iOS devices.

History 

JioCinema was launched on 5 September along with the public launch of Jio in 2016. JioCinema is one of the apps provided exclusively for Jio users along with other apps (JioTV, JioSaavn, JioNews, JioMart, JioMeet, JioChat and JioTalks), owned by Jio Platforms.

JioCinema was earlier available only on Google Play Store and iOS App Store, however, also launched a web version a year after the official launch and after that on JioPhone and TV.

In September 2022, CCI approved the merger of JioCinema into Viacom 18.

In 2022, JioCinema was made free to all users irrespective of their network. 

This app was heavily criticized by viewers during first two games of FIFA 2022 world cup due to lags in streaming.

Content partners 

JioCinema has aggregated content from partners like ALTBalaji, Eros Now, Paramount Pictures, Zee Entertainment, Viacom 18, Shemaroo Entertainment, Balaji Motion Pictures, Sun Nxt, Sony and others.

In December 2018, JioCinema partnered with Disney India to offer Disney content in the JioCinema app. Disney has withdrawn from this deal after the introduction of Disney+ Hotstar in India.

In May 2020, JioCinema partnered with Hoichoi to provide Bengali content in Hindi dubbed version.

In November 2022, JioCinema became the official broadcaster of 2022 FIFA World Cup in India.

In December 2022, JioCinema became official digital streaming partner of IPL as Viacom18 acquired digital streaming rights till 2027 earlier in June.

In March 2023, JioCinema became the official digital streaming partner of Women's Premier League as Viacom18 acquired the streaming rights earlier in January.

OEM partners 

In August 2019, Xiaomi, TCL  and in November 2019, Intex announced JioCinema app integration for their smart TVs.

List of originals

List of exclusive content

List of films

Viewership 
As per Statista Q2 2020 report, JioCinema has 7% market share among many competitors like Netflix and Amazon Prime Video with 20% each market share, Disney+ Hotstar has 17% market share, Zee5 with 9%, Alt Balaji and Sony Liv with 4% market share each, and other streaming(OTT) platforms have 19% market share.

See also 

 List of OTT Media Service in India

References

External links 
 

Music streaming services
Reliance Industries subsidiaries
Indian entertainment websites
Internet television streaming services
Subscription video on demand services
Jio
Companies based in Mumbai
Indian companies established in 2016
2016 establishments in Maharashtra
2022 mergers and acquisitions